Daniel Louis Aiello III  (January 27, 1957 – May 1, 2010) was an American stunt performer, stunt coordinator, director, and actor in film and television.

He was the son of actor Danny Aiello.

Death
Aiello died of pancreatic cancer, age 53, in Hillsdale, New Jersey, on May 1, 2010. He was survived by his wife, two daughters, parents, and three siblings. The first episode of the second season of Royal Pains, "Spasticity", was dedicated to him, as was the first episode of the sixth season of Rescue Me, "Legacy".

References

External links

1957 births
2010 deaths
American male film actors
American male television actors
American stunt performers
Deaths from cancer in New Jersey
Deaths from pancreatic cancer
People from Hillsdale, New Jersey
Entertainers from the Bronx
American people of Italian descent